The 1965 Lafayette Leopards football team was an American football team that represented Lafayette College during the 1965 NCAA College Division football season. Lafayette finished last in the Middle Atlantic Conference, University Division, and was one of three co-champions in the Middle Three Conference.

In their third year under head coach Kenneth Bunn, the Leopards compiled a 3–7 record. Thomas Rosenberg, Joseph Smodish and Gabriel Washo were the team captains.

In conference play, Lafayette's 1–5 record against MAC University Division opponents represented the worst winning percentage in the seven-team circuit; Lehigh finished slightly ahead in the standings with a 1–3 record. All three teams in the Middle Three recorded one win and one loss against league rivals, splitting the championship three ways. Lafayette lost to Lehigh but beat Rutgers.

Lafayette played its home games at Fisher Field on College Hill in Easton, Pennsylvania.

Schedule

References

Lafayette
Lafayette
Lafayette Leopards football seasons
Lafayette Leopards football